The Pacific Fair Bus Station at Broadbeach is serviced by Surfside Buslines. It is part of the Pacific Fair Shopping Centre and is close to Broadbeach Library, The Star Gold Coast and the Gold Coast Convention & Exhibition Centre.

It is in Zone 5 of the TransLink integrated public transport system.

For more information on TransLink bus routes, see TransLink services
. For accurate bus timetables and route maps, see the TransLink website.

Until the G:link light rail network opened in July 2014, it was the terminating point for number of services, these have now been extended to Broadbeach South bus station.

References

Bus stations in Gold Coast City
Broadbeach, Queensland